This is a list of awards and nominations received by Northern Irish actor, director, producer and screenwriter Sir Kenneth Branagh. Having trained Royal Academy of Dramatic Art in London, he became known for his stage and screen adaptations of William Shakespeare. In 2012 he was appointed a Knight Bachelor by Queen Elizabeth II. He was made a Freeman of his native city of Belfast in January 2018. In 2020, he was listed at number 20 on The Irish Times list of Ireland's greatest film actors.

Branagh is known for his films as a director including the William Shakespeare film adaptations Henry V (1989), Much Ado About Nothing (1993), Hamlet (1996), as well as the murder mystery Dead Again (1991), the drama Peter's Friends (1992) and the horror adaptation Mary Shelley's Frankenstein (1994). He also directed Thor (2011), the live action adaptation of Cinderella (2015), Murder on the Orient Express (2017) and the drama Belfast (2021).

He has received many accolades for his work including eight Academy Award nominations for Best Picture, Best Director, Best Actor, Best Supporting Actor, Best Adapted Screenplay, Academy Award for Best Original Screenplay, and Best Live Action Short Film. He also earned ten BAFTA Award nominations, five Primetime Emmy Award nominations, five Golden Globe Award nominations, a Grammy Award nomination, and three Screen Actors Guild Award nominations. For his work on the West End stage he has earned seven Laurence Olivier Award nominations and two wins for Best Newcomer in 1982 and the Society of London Theatre Award in 2017.

Major associations

Academy Awards

BAFTA Awards

Emmy Awards

Golden Globe Awards

Grammy Awards

Olivier Awards

Screen Actors Guild Awards

Major Festivals

Berlin Film Festival

Cannes Film Festival

Toronto International Film Festival

Venice Film Festival

Other awards and nominations

Australian Academy Awards

AARP Movies for Grownups Awards

Broadcast Film Critics Association Awards

Broadcasting Press Guild

Capri Award

Chicago Film Critics Association Awards

Directors Guild of America Awards

Detroit Film Critics Society

European Film Awards

Golden Raspberry Awards

Independent Spirit Awards

London Film Critics' Circle

Middleburg Film Festival

Phoenix Film Critics Society Award

Producers Guild of America Award

SCAD Savannah Film Festival

San Diego Film Critics Society Award

Sant Jordi Awards

Satellite Awards

Saturn Awards

Vancouver Film Critics Circle Awards

Washington D.C. Area Film Critics Association Awards

WhatsOnStage Awards

References

External links
 

Awards
Lists of awards received by British actor
Lists of awards received by film director